Scoparia benigna is a moth in the family Crambidae. It was described by Edward Meyrick in 1910. It is found on Réunion, Madagascar and Mauritius.

References

Moths described in 1910
Scorparia